Lam Plai Mat is a district (amphoe) of Buriram province, northeastern Thailand.

Geography
Neighboring districts are (from the northeast clockwise) Khu Mueang, Mueang Buriram, Chamni, Nong Hong of Buriram Province, Huai Thalaeng, Chum Phuang, and Lam Thamenchai of Nakhon Ratchasima province.

Motto
The Lam Plai Mat District's Motto is "Mat river park, Thamen Chai stupa, great shire, tradition fabric, delicious food, Mee Chai center."

Administration

Central administration 
The district Lam Plai Mat is subdivided into 16 subdistricts (Tambon), which are further subdivided into 216 administrative villages (Muban).

Local administration 
There are 2 subdistrict municipalities (Thesaban Tambon) in the district:
 Thamen Chai consisting of parts of the subdistricts Thamen Chai, Nong Bua Khok.
 Lam Plai Mat consisting of the complete subdistrict Lam Plai Mat and parts of the subdistricts Nong Khu, Hin Khon.

There are 15 subdistrict administrative organizations (SAO) in the district:
 Nong Khu consisting of parts of the subdistrict Nong Khu.
 Salaeng Phan consisting of the complete subdistrict Salaeng Phan.
 Thamen Chai consisting of parts of the subdistrict Thamen Chai.
 Talat Pho consisting of the complete subdistrict Talat Pho.
 Nong Kathing consisting of the complete subdistrict Nong Kathing.
 Khok Klang consisting of the complete subdistrict Khok Klang.
 Khok Sa-at consisting of the complete subdistrict Khok Sa-at.
 Mueang Faek consisting of the complete subdistrict Mueang Faek.
 Ban Yang consisting of the complete subdistrict Ban Yang.
 Phathairin consisting of the complete subdistrict Phathairin.
 Khok Lam consisting of the complete subdistrict Khok Lam.
 Hin Khon consisting of parts of the subdistrict Hin Khon.
 Nong Bua Khok consisting of parts of the subdistrict Nong Bua Khok.
 Bu Pho consisting of the complete subdistrict Bu Pho.
 Nong Don consisting of the complete subdistrict Nong Don.

References

External links
Amphoe.com on Lam Plai Mat

Lam Plai Mat